John Roslyn (Ros) Garnet (1906–1998) was an Australian biochemist and naturalist with a strong interest in nature conservation.

Life
Garnet began his career in the Commonwealth Health Department Laboratory at Port Pirie, where he worked from 1928 to 1930. However, for most of his career (1930 – 1971) he was based at the Commonwealth Serum Laboratories in Parkville, Melbourne. Garnet was active in the conservation movement and was a founder of the Victorian National Parks Association in 1952, as well as serving as its Honorary Secretary for 21 years. He had a particular interest in Wilsons Promontory National Park.

Honours and awards
 Australian Natural History Medallion (1966)
 Member of the Order of Australia (AM) (1982)

Publications
 Garnet, J. Ros. (1965). The Vegetation of Wyperfeld National Park (North-West Victoria). A survey of its Vegetation and Plant Communities, together with a Check-list of the Vascular Flora as at December 1964.. Field Naturalists’ Club of Victoria.
 Garnet, J. Ros. (1966). Spider, Insect and Man. Commonwealth Serum Laboratories: Parkville.
 Garnet, J. Ros. (Editor). (1968). Venomous Australian Animals Dangerous to Man. Commonwealth Serum Laboratories: Parkville.
 Garnet, J. Ros. (1970). Wilson's Promontory. OUP: London.
 Garnet, J. Ros. (1971). The Wildflowers of Wilson's Promontory National Park. Lothian Books: Melbourne.
 Garnet, J. Ros.; & Conabere, Elizabeth. (1987). Wildflowers of South-Eastern Australia. Greenhouse Publications: Melbourne.

References

1906 births
1998 deaths
Australian biochemists
Australian conservationists
Members of the Order of Australia